The 2021 Homeland Union – Lithuanian Christian Democrats leadership election was planned to take place on 27–28 March 2021 to elect the leader of the Homeland Union - Lithuanian Christian Democrats.

For the first time, not only the members of the party would be able to vote. Those over the age of 16 and are the citizens of the Republic of Lithuania, do not belong to other parties or election committees, and support the values of Homeland Union - Lithuanian Christian Democrats also would be able to register for the election.

On 26 February 2021, it was announced that the only candidate to participate in the leadership election will be the current party leader Gabrielius Landsbergis, others have refused in his favor and signed a general refusal to run in this election.

The party's council decided not to hold an election and to approve the candidate at a council meeting. On 28 February 2021, Gabrielius Landsbergis was approved as the leader for another four-year term.

Candidates 
According to the voting procedure, the candidates are nominated by the party's council, LKD, fractions, communities and departaments' meetings. The list of proposed candidates was announced on 23 February 2021.

On 26 February 2021, it was announced that the only candidate to participate in the leadership election will be the current party leader Gabrielius Landsbergis, others have refused in his favor and signed a general refusal to run in this election. They base such a decision on a special pandemic situation, which requires concentration and united work in the Seimas and the Government.

According to the procedure for the leadership election, in the event of a situation where only one candidate is present and approved, the decision on the further course of the election will be proposed by the party's Supervisory Committee and approved by the party's council.

Declared

Proposed and withdrawn candidates 
 Paulius Saudargas
 Laurynas Kasčiūnas
 Radvilė Morkūnaitė-Mikulėnienė
 Gintarė Skaistė
 Jurgita Šiugždinienė
 Žygimantas Pavilionis
 Arvydas Anušauskas
 Monika Navickienė
 Audronius Ažubalis
 Valdas Benkunskas
 Irena Degutienė
 Rasa Juknevičienė
 Mykolas Majauskas
 Kazys Starkevičius
 Šarūnas Vaitkus

Results
The party's council decided not to hold an election and to approve the candidate at a council meeting. On 28 February 2021, Gabrielius Landsbergis was approved as the leader for another four-year term.

References

Homeland Union politicians
Lithuanian Christian Democrats politicians
Political party leadership elections in Lithuania
Homeland Union - Lithuanian Christian Democrats leadership election